Burke is an unincorporated section of Fairfax County, Virginia, United States, traditionally defined as the area served by the Burke post office (Zip Code 22015). Burke includes two census-designated places: the Burke CDP, population 42,312 in 2020

and the Burke Centre CDP, population 17,518 in 2020.

History
Burke is named after Silas Burke (1796–1854), a 19th-century slave-owner, farmer, merchant, and local politician who built a house on a hill overlooking the valley of Pohick Creek in approximately 1824. The house still stands. When the Orange and Alexandria Railroad was constructed in the late 1840s, the railroad station at the base of that hill was named "Burke's Station" after Burke, who owned the land in the area and donated a right-of-way to the railroad company. The community that grew up around the railroad station acquired a post office branch in 1852. The railroad tracks located on the same historical line are owned by the Norfolk Southern Railway and form part of the Manassas line of the Virginia Railway Express commuter rail system, which has two stations (Rolling Road and Burke Centre) in the Burke area. The original Burke Station building can still be seen in the community, turned 90 degrees from its historical footprint.

During the Civil War, the railway station was garrisoned by Union troops. The Bog Wallow Ambush occurred nearby in 1861. On December 28, 1862, Confederate cavalry under General J.E.B. Stuart raided the station. Stuart seized supplies from the area, destroyed a nearby bridge, monitored Union messages passing over the telegraph lines, and then famously sent a telegram to Union Quartermaster General Montgomery C. Meigs complaining of the poor quality of the mules he had captured. Further action was seen in the neighborhood in 1863.

Copperthite was a wealthy man and the largest non-government employer in Washington, D.C.; in 1914 his factory in Georgetown produced 50,000 pies a day, earning him the nickname "King of Pie". Copperthite built four hotels, stables and expanded the general store. Burke became a popular summer destination where people attended fairs and saw horse races, foot races, motorcycle races, exhibition boxing matches and baseball games. Trains ran to Burke from Union Station in D.C., Alexandria, Prince William and Loudoun counties and as far away as Richmond. Copperthite installed the first phones in Burke, and his stables housed the horses of President McKinley and Vice President Theodore Roosevelt. The site of the racetrack is marked by a historic marker erected by Fairfax County in 2016.

The area remained predominantly rural into the mid-20th century. After World War I, Burke's population grew as federal government workers moved into the area within easy commuting distance to Washington.

In 1951, the U.S. Civil Aeronautics Administration announced plans to condemn  of land in Burke to construct a second airport to serve the Washington metropolitan area. After a lengthy lobbying campaign by area residents, the government in 1958 selected a different site near Chantilly, Virginia, which would become Washington Dulles International Airport. Land that had been purchased to build the airport was later developed into Burke Lake Park and the planned community of Burke Centre.

The first large subdivision in the vicinity, Kings Park, was constructed beginning in 1960, and was followed by many others over the next two decades, converting Burke into a densely populated suburban community.

A historic marker in Burke denotes the Huldah Coffer House, owned by a prominent resident of the county for many years. Another  privately erected historical marker indicates the site of the former Lee Chapel Methodist church, which was intentionally burned in 1951 after having been abandoned for some years, but whose cemetery remains on the site.

Historic sites
 Mulberry Hill (c. 1790), located at 9417 Windsor Way
 Silas Burke House (original c. 1820; rebuilt c. 1853), located at 9617 Burke Lake Road
 Burke Methodist Church/Burke Station (c. 1857), located at 9415 Burke Lake Road Burke
 Little Zion Baptist Church and Cemetery (1891), located at 9415 Burke Lake Road

Geography and climate

Burke is located south of the center of Fairfax County at  (38.781480, −77.270750). The Burke CDP is bordered by the CDPs of Burke Centre to the west, Kings Park West to the northwest, Long Branch and Wakefield to the north, Kings Park to the northeast, West Springfield to the east, Newington Forest to the south, and South Run to the southwest. Burke Lake Park, which borders the Burke CDP to the southwest and is not part of any CDP, is a large recreational park operated by the Fairfax County Park Authority, featuring a golf course and woodland surrounding Burke Lake.

Most of the water making up Burke consists of artificial ponds and lakes.

Demographics

As of the census of 2000, there were 59,830 people, 19,215 households, and 15,756 families residing in the community. Burke is the largest community in Virginia recognized by the Census Bureau, other than counties and incorporated cities (although 11 cities and Arlington, Virginia have greater populations). The population density was 5,008.0 people per square mile (1,933.4/km2). There were 19,367 housing units at an average density of 1,679.9/sq mi (648.5/km2). The racial makeup of the CDP was 74.36% White, 14.66% Asian, 5.04% African American, 3.27% from two or more races, 0.21% Native American, 0.08% Pacific Islander, and 2.37% from other races. Hispanic or Latino of any race were 7.43% of the population.

There were 19,215 households, out of which 44.0% had children under the age of 18 living with them, 70.6% were married couples living together, 8.7% had a female householder with no husband present, and 18.0% were non-families. 13.4% of all households were made up of individuals, and 2.9% had someone living alone who was 65 years of age or older. The average household size was 2.99 and the average family size was 3.30.

The population distribution by age is 27.9% under the age of 18, 7.3% from 18 to 24, 28.6% from 25 to 44, 30.6% from 45 to 64, and 5.5% who were 65 years of age or older. The median age was 38 years. For every 100 females there were 95.1 males. For every 100 females age 18 and over, there were 91.1 males.

According to a 2007 estimate, the median income for a household in Burke is $113,034, and the median income for a family was $125,905. Males had a median income of $66,149 versus $41,933 for females. The per capita income for the CDP was $34,936. About 1.5% of families and 2.3% of the population were below the poverty line, including 2.4% of those under age 18 and 6.0% of those age 65 or over.

Education

Primary and secondary schools
Elementary and secondary school students in Burke are served by the Fairfax County Public School System. The elementary schools in Burke are White Oaks, Terra Centre, Fairview and Cherry Run, although students also attend Ravensworth and Kings Park/Kings Glen as well Sangster.  Burke is home to Lake Braddock Secondary School, though many students within the district attend Robinson Secondary School and West Springfield High School, as well as South County Secondary School.

Public libraries
Fairfax County Public Library operates the Pohick Regional Library, the Burke Centre Library, and the Kings Park Library in the CDP.

Transportation
Burke is served by two Virginia Railway Express stations, Burke Centre and Rolling Road, both on the Manassas line.  It is also served by the Metrobus (Washington, D.C.) system, via the 17A, B, G, H, K, and L and the 18G, H, J, P, R, and S routes, with rush-hour-only service to the Pentagon and Springfield Metro stations.

Recreation and events

Recreation
Along the boundaries of adjoining Fairfax Station, Burke Lake Park is an  park centered on a  recreational lake. The park contains a  jogging trail, campsites, numerous picnic and sports areas, an 18-hole par three golf course with driving range, a disc golf course, miniature golf course, boat rental, amphitheater, ice cream parlor, carousel, and miniature train ride.

Events
 From April through December, the Burke Farmers Market takes place each Saturday morning, from 8 a.m. to 12 p.m., in the Burke Centre VRE station parking lot.
 Burke Centre hosts a fall festival for two days, every September.
 Burke Nursery & Garden Center hosts a Pumpkin Playground every October.

Communities
Burke Centre is a  planned community that was formerly part of the Burke CDP but is now a separate census-designated area. It is located west of Burke and is divided into five subcommunities: The Commons, The Landings, The Oaks, The Ponds and The Woods. Other notable communities in the Burke area include Rolling Valley West, Burke Village I & II, Lakepointe, Longwood Knolls, Burke Lake Meadows, Edgewater, Lake Braddock, Signal Hill, Crownleigh, and Cherry Run along with Burke Station Square.

Nearby towns, communities, etc.
All distances are by road from Burke Station, the original settlement of Burke:

 Annandale (5 miles NE)
 Clifton (8 miles W)
 Fairfax (5 miles NW)
 Lorton (9 miles SE)
 Springfield (6 miles E)

Notable people
 Retesh Bhalla, aka Sonjay Dutt, professional wrestler
Hubert Davis, head coach of the University of North Carolina men's basketball team, former professional basketball player
Chad Dukes, Washington-area radio personality
Glennon Doyle, blogger and author
Tiffany Dupont, actress
Greg Eklund, drummer for Everclear
Mia Hamm, American retired professional soccer player, two-time Olympic gold medalist, and two-time FIFA Women's World Cup champion who attended Lake Braddock Secondary School in Burke
Nikki Hornsby, singer- songwriter, musician, NARAS member among others recording music industry organizations, founder of CJP-NHRecords attended Wakefield Forest Elementary school to W.T.Woodson High School before Fairfax Hall, Waynesboro VA to Belmont Abbey, Belmont, North Carolina & returned to George Mason University in Fairfax Virginia but home address was Rt.1, in Burke 
Allen Johnson, gold medalist in 1996 Olympics in Atlanta (110 metre hurdles) and a four-time world champion; attended Lake Braddock Secondary School
Nguyễn Ngọc Loan, South Vietnamese general and chief of the South Vietnamese National Police who lived in Burke from 1975 until his death in 1998 and was the subject of an iconic Vietnam-era picture by Eddie Adams.
David W. Marsden, Virginia state senator
John William Minton, aka Big John Studd, former professional wrestler
Travis Morrison, member of the band The Dismemberment Plan
Ryan Newell, lead guitarist in Sister Hazel
Rick Renzi, former member of the U.S. House of Representatives
Byron Saxton, professional wrestler
Ronald J. Shurer, US Army special forces staff sergeant and medic (retired), Medal of Honor recipient
Mary Simpson, violinist
Timothy L. Smith, historian and educator
Joseph Sobran, journalist and writer for the National Review
Justin Spring, Olympic medal-winning gymnast
Jeffrey "Blase" Tsang, professional Overwatch player for the Houston Outlaws

References

Further reading

External links

Census-designated places in Fairfax County, Virginia
Census-designated places in Virginia